Łubianka  is a village in Toruń County, Kuyavian-Pomeranian Voivodeship, in north-central Poland. It is the seat of the gmina (administrative district) called Gmina Łubianka.

The village has a population of 953.

References

Villages in Toruń County